Lutetium–hafnium dating is a geochronological dating method utilizing the radioactive decay system of lutetium–176 to hafnium–176. With a commonly accepted half-life of 37.1 billion years, the long-living Lu–Hf decay pair survives through geological time scales, thus is useful in geological studies. Due to chemical properties of the two elements, namely their valences and ionic radii, Lu is usually found in trace amount in rare-earth element loving minerals, such as garnet and phosphates, while Hf is usually found in trace amount in zirconium-rich minerals, such as zircon, baddeleyite and zirkelite.

The trace concentration of the Lu and Hf in earth materials posed some technological difficulties in using Lu–Hf dating extensively in the 1980s. With the use of inductively coupled plasma mass spectrometry (ICP–MS) with multi-collector (also known as MC–ICP–MS) in later years, the dating method is made applicable to date diverse earth materials. The Lu–Hf system is now a common tool in geological studies such as igneous and metamorphic rock petrogenesis, early earth mantle-crust differentiation, and provenance.

Radiometric dating 

Lutetium is a rare-earth element, with one naturally-occurring stable isotope 175Lu and one naturally-occurring radioactive isotope 176Lu. When 176Lu atoms are incorporated into earth materials, such as rocks and minerals, they began to be "trapped" while starting to decay. Through radioactive decay, an unstable nucleus decays into another relatively stable one. Radiometric dating makes use of the decay relationship to calculate how long the atoms have been "trapped", i.e. the time since the earth material was formed.

Decay of 176Lu 

The only natural occurring radioactive isotope of lutetium ^{176}_{71}Lu decays in the following two ways:

^{176}_{71}Lu -> {^{176}_{72}Hf} + e^- 

{^{176}_{71}Lu} +     e^-     -> {^{176}_{70}Yb} 

Lutetium,^{176}_{71}Lu can decay into ^{176}_{72}Hf , a heavier element, or ytterbium, ^{176}_{70}Yb , a lighter element. However, as the major mode of decay is by β− emission, i.e. release of electron (e−), as in the case for^{176}_{71}Lu  decaying to ^{176}_{72}Hf , the presence of^{176}_{70}Yb  is of negligible effect to Lu–Hf age determination.

Decay constant determination 

The decay constant of ^{176}Lu can be obtained through direct counting experiments and by comparing Lu–Hf ages with other isotope system ages of samples whose ages are determined. The commonly accepted decay constant has the value of 1.867 (± 0.007) × 10−11 yr−1. However, there remain discrepancies on the value of decay constant.

Age determination 
An age equation is set up for every radiometric dating technique to describe the mathematical relationship of the number of parent and daughter nuclide. In Lu–Hf system, the parent would be Lu (the radioactive isotope) and Hf as the daughter nuclide (the product after radioactive decay). The age equation to Lu–Hf system is as follows:

 

where:  
 (^{176}Hf/^{177}Hf) is the measured ratio of the two isotopes of the sample.
 (^{176}Hf/^{177}Hf)_i is the initial ratio of the two isotopes when the sample is formed.
 (^{176}Lu/^{177}Hf) is the measured ratio of the two isotopes of the sample.
  is the decay constant of ^{176}Lu.
 t is the time since the sample is formed.

The two isotopes, 176Lu and 176Hf, in the system are measured as ratio to the reference stable isotope of 177Hf. The measured ratio can be obtained from mass spectrometry. A common practice for geochronological dating is to establish an isochron plot. Multiple set of data would be measured and plotted with 176Hf/177Hf on y-axis and 176Lu/177Hf on x-axis. A linear relationship would be obtained. The initial ratio can either be assumed to be natural isotopic abundance ratio or, for a better approach, obtained from the y-intercept of plotted isochron. The slope of the plotted isochron would represent .

Epsilon (ɛHf value) 
ɛHf value is an expression of ^{176}Hf/^{177}Hf  ratio of a sample with respect to ^{176}Hf/^{177}Hf ratio of chondritic uniform reservoir. The usage of ɛHf value is a common practice in Hf studies. ɛHf has a range of value from +15 to -70 at present. ɛHf is expressed in the following equation:

 

where:
 "0" in the bracket denoting time = 0, meaning present day. Numbers in bracket can represent any time in the past up to the formation of earth.
  is the Hf-176 to Hf-177 ratio in the sample. For t = 0, it represent the ratio at present.
  is the Hf-176 to Hf-177 ratio in the chondritic uniform reservoir. For t = 0, it represent the ratio at present.

Geochemistry of lutetium and hafnium 

According to the Goldschmidt classification scheme, Lu and Hf are both lithophile (earth-loving) elements, meaning they are mainly found in the silicate fraction of Earth, i.e. the mantle and crust. During the formation of the Earth, the two elements tended not be fractionated into the core during core formation, i.e. not concentrated in the core, unlike siderophile elements (iron-loving elements). Lu and Hf are also refractory elements, meaning they quickly condensed from the protoplanetary disk to form the solid part of Earth, as opposed to volatile elements. The two elements as a result would not be found in Earth's early atmosphere. Due to these characteristics, the two elements are relatively stationary throughout planetary evolution and are thought to retain the isotopic abundance characteristics of primitive planetary material, i.e. chondritic uniform reservoir (CHUR).

Both Lu and Hf are incompatible trace elements and relatively immobile. However, Hf is more incompatible than Lu, and thus it is relatively enriched  in the crust and in silicate melts. Thus, a higher Lu/Hf ratio (also meaning a higher 176Hf / 177Hf ratio, over time, due to Lu decay) is generally found in the residual solid during partial melting and removal of a liquid from a geochemical reservoir. It is worth noting that variation in Lu/Hf ratio is usually very small.

ɛHf value implications 
ɛHf values are closely related to the enrichment or depletion of Hf relative to the chondritic uniform reservoir. A positive ɛHf value means that 176Hf concentration in sample is larger than that of chondritic uniform reservoir. This also means a higher Lu/Hf ratio in sample. Positive value would be found in the residue solid after melt extraction, as the liquid would be enriched in Hf. It is worth noting that the enrichment of Hf in melt would means removing the more abundant isotopes of Hf to a larger extent than 176Hf, resulting in the observed 176Hf/177Hf enrichment in residue solid. Using the same logic, a negative ɛHf value would represent the extracted melt from reservoir, forming an evolved, juvenile material.

The original figure 9 from Rehman et al. (2012) showed an intermedia, mixed ɛHf trend for the eclogites that was studied. The experimental result indicate that the eclogites were formed from ocean-island basalt with contamination from sediments to produce the intermediate ɛHf values.

CHUR model age 
The chondritic uniform reservoir model age is the age at which the material, from which rock and mineral forms, leaves the chondritic uniform reservoir, i.e. the mantle, when assuming the silicate earth retained chemical signature of chondritic uniform reservoir. As described in previous section, melting will cause a fractionation of Lu and Hf in the melt and residue solid, thus resulting in Lu/Hf and Hf/Hf values deviating from chondritic uniform reservoir values. The time or age at which the Lu/Hf and Hf/Hf values from the sample and chondritic uniform reservoir matches is the chondritic uniform reservoir model age.

 

where:
 "0" in the bracket denoting time = 0, meaning present day.
 t CHUR  is the chondritic uniform reservoir model age.
 λ is the decay constant.
  is the Hf-176 to Hf-177 ratio in the sample.
  is the Hf-176 to Hf-177 ratio in the chondritic uniform reservoir.

Lu/Hf and Hf/Hf ratios of CHUR 
The chondritic uniform reservoir model are tightly constrained in order to use Lu–Hf system for age determination. Chondrites represent primitive materials from solar nebula which later accrete to form planetesimals, and to further extent meaning the primitive undifferentiated Earth. Chondritic uniform reservoir are used to model the chemistry of the silicate layers of Earth as these layers were unaffected by planetary evolution processes. To characterise the chondritic uniform reservoir composition in terms of Lu and Hf, chondrites of different petrological types are used for analysing Lu and Hf concentrations.

However, discrepancies of  ^{176}Lu/^{177}Hf  and ^{176}Hf/^{177}Hf  ratios remain. Earlier studies experimented on chondrites of all petrologic types. The ^{176}Lu/^{177}Hf  ratios yielded varies by 18%, or even by 28%. The ^{176}Hf/^{177}Hf  ratios yielded varies by 14 ɛHf units. One later study focused on chondrites of petrological types 1 to 3, which are unequilibrated, show variation of 3% in ^{176}Lu/^{177}Hf  ratios, and 4 ɛHf units in ^{176}Hf/^{177}Hf  ratios.

Analytical methods 
In the earliest years, at around the 1980s, age acquisition based on Lu–Hf system make use of chemical dissolution of sample and thermal ionization mass spectrometry (TIMS). Generally, rock samples are powdered and treated with HF and HNO3 in a Teflon bomb. The bomb is put in oven at 160 °C for four days. Following that comes acids treatment for purification from major elements and other undesirable trace elements. Different studies may use slightly different protocols and procedures, but all are trying to ensure complete dissolution of Lu and Hf bearing materials. The technique of isotope dilution is often necessary for precise determination of concentrations. Isotope dilution is done by adding materials of known concentration of Lu and Hf into the dissolved samples. The samples can then go through TIMS for data acquisition.

The above sample preparation procedures prevent convenient analysis of Lu–Hf, thus limiting its usage in the 1980s. Also, the age determination using TIMS require samples of high Lu and Hf concentration to be successful. However, common mineral phases have low concentrations of Lu and Hf, which again limits Lu–Hf uses.

The most common analytical methods for Lu–Hf determination nowadays is by inductively coupled plasma mass spectrometry (ICP–MS). ICP–MS, with multi-collector, allow precision determination with materials with low Hf concentration, such as apatite and garnet. The amount of sample needed for determination is also smaller, facilitating utilization of zircon for Lu–Hf ages.

Selective dissolution, i.e. dissolving the garnet but leaving the refractory inclusions intact, is applied to the Lu–Hf system.

Applications

Igneous rock petrogenesis 
Lu–Hf isotope system can provide information on where and when a magmatic body originate. By applying Hf concentration determination to zircons from A-type granites in Laurentia, ɛHf values ranging from −31.9 to −21.9 were obtained, representing a crustal melt origin. Apatite has also promising Lu–Hf information, as apatite has high Lu content relative to Hf content. In cases where rocks are silica-poor, if more evolved rocks of the same magmatic origin can be identified, apatite could provide high Lu/Hf ratio data to produce accurate isochron, with an example from Smålands Taberg, southern Sweden, where apatite Lu/Hf age of 1204.3±1.8 million yr was identified as the lower boundary of a 1.2 billion yr magmatic event that caused the Fe–Ti mineralization at Smålands Taberg.

Metamorphic rock petrogenesis and metamorphic events 

In understanding metamorphic rocks, Lu–Hf can still provide information of origin. In cases where zircon phase is absent or very low in abundance, such as eclogite with cumulate protolith, kyanite and orthopyroxene eclogites can be candidate for Hf analysis. Although the overall rare-earth element concentration is low is the two eclogites, Lu/Hf ratios is high, therefore enabling concentration determination of Lu and Hf.

Garnets play an important role in Lu/Hf applications, as they are common metamorphic minerals while having high affinity to rare-earth element. This means garnets generally have high Lu/Hf ratios. Dating of garnets with Lu–Hf could provide information of history of garnet growth during prograde metamorphism and peak P-T conditions. With the help of garnet Lu/Hf ages, a study on Lago di Cignana, western Alps, Italy, an age of 48.8±2.1 million yr for lower boundary of garnet growth time was identified. From this, the burial rate of ultra-high-pressure rocks at Lago di Cignana was estimated to be 0.23–0.47 cm/yr, which suggest ocean floor rocks were carried down to subduction and reached ultra-high-pressure metamorphism conditions.

Conventional isochron ages are obtained from bulk garnet separates and are only an estimate of the average age of the overall growth of garnet. To give precise estimates of the pace of growth of a single garnet crystal, geochronologists use microsampling methods to collect and date small consecutive zones of garnet crystals.

Another low-temperature, high-pressure metamorphic index mineral, lawsonite was brought into use in recent years to understand subduction metamorphism using Lu/Hf dating. A study showed that lawsonite could be significant in dating low-temperature metamorphic rocks, typically in prograde metamorphism in a subduction zone settings, as garnets are formed after lawsonite is stabilized, so that lawsonite can be enriched in Lu for radiometric dating.

Early Earth mantle-crust differentiation 
The crust formation process is supposedly chemically depleting the mantle, as crust forms from partial melts originating from the mantle. However, the process and extent of depletion could not be concluded based on a few isotope characteristics, as some isotope systems are thought to be susceptible to re-setting by metamorphism. To further constrain the modelling of depleted mantle, Lu–Hf information from zircons are useful, as zircons are resistant to Lu–Hf re-equilibrating.

Detrital zircon and provenance 

Hf ages determined from detrital zircon can help to identify major event of crustal growth. By analyzing detrital zircon in Yangtze River sediments, a group of researchers produced a statistical distribution of Hf model ages of the sediments. The statistical peaks of age ranges were identified: 2000 Ma–1200 Ma, 2700 Ma–2400 Ma, and 3200 Ma-2900 Ma, indicating crustal growth events at ages of Paleoproterozoic to Mesoproterozoic, and of Archean in the South China Block.

Hf ages from detrital zircon also help tracing sediment source. A study on detrital zircon from sandstones in the Oslo Rift, Norway identified major sediment source in Fennoscandia region and also a minor source in Variscan Mountains of central Europe during Late Devonian to Late Carboniferous by U–Pb and Lu–Hf characteristics of source rocks and sediments.

References 

Radiometric dating
Lutetium
Hafnium